Reinaldo Román (born 23 May 1984, in Luque) is a Paraguayan footballer playing for 3 de Febrero.

He began his career at Sportivo Luqueño in 2004. Román received first cap at the friendly match against South Africa on 26 March 2008.

References

External links 
 

1984 births
Living people
Paraguayan footballers
Paraguay international footballers
Association football defenders
Sportivo Luqueño players
Club Guaraní players
Expatriate footballers in Ecuador
Sportspeople from Luque